Fyodor Grigorevich Gogel (born 1775 - died 1827) was a lieutenant-general of the Russian Empire, principally known for his service during the Napoleonic Wars.

Biography
Born in Saratov, to a noble family, Fyodor was the brother of Ivan Gogel, and a relative of Alexander Gogel. Fyodor entered military service on 12 January 1785, and became a captain, several years later, on 12 January 1792.

In 1805, he fought at Austerlitz. In 1812, he fought at Saltanovka, Smolensk, Shevardino, Borodino, Vyazma and Krasnyi.

For his service during the Napoleonic Wars, he received the Order of St. Anna (2nd class), Order of St. George (4th class), Order of St. George (3rd class), as well as the Prussian Pour le Mérite.

Fyodor was promoted to lieutenant-general on 24 December 1824.

Notes

References

Sources
 
 

1775 births
1827 deaths
Military personnel  from Saratov
People from Saratovsky Uyezd
Russian commanders of the Napoleonic Wars
Recipients of the Order of St. Anna, 2nd class
Recipients of the Order of St. George
Recipients of the Pour le Mérite (military class)